Oleksandr Oleksandrovych Sopko (born 11 May 1958 in Kryvyi Rih) is a retired Ukrainian football defender.

He capped for USSR youth team at 1977 FIFA World Youth Championship.

Honours
Shakhtar Donetsk
Soviet Cup: 1983
Soviet Union youth
FIFA World Youth Championship: 1977

References

External links
 

1958 births
Living people
Sportspeople from Kryvyi Rih
Soviet footballers
Soviet Union youth international footballers
Soviet Top League players
Soviet expatriate footballers
FC Kryvbas Kryvyi Rih players
FC Dynamo Kyiv players
FC Shakhtar Donetsk players
FC Lokomotíva Košice players
MFK Zemplín Michalovce players
Slovak National Football League players
3. Liga (Slovakia) players
Association football defenders
Ukrainian footballers
Ukrainian expatriate footballers
Expatriate footballers in Czechoslovakia
Expatriate footballers in Slovakia
Ukrainian expatriate sportspeople in Slovakia
Soviet expatriate sportspeople in Czechoslovakia
Ukrainian football managers
Ukrainian expatriate football managers
Expatriate football managers in Slovakia
MFK Zemplín Michalovce managers